Sangokushi V (三國志V) is the 5th installment in Koei's Romance of the Three Kingdoms series. The game was released for MS-DOS, Sega Saturn, PlayStation, PlayStation Portable.

Koei planned to release the PlayStation version in North America in the third quarter of 1998, but this released was cancelled. With no English version of the game on the table, the USA division of Koei sold the Traditional Chinese version of the DOS game in the United States by mail order, without technical or game play support. No further English versions of Romance of the Three Kingdoms games (including spinoffs) were released for PC platforms until Romance of the Three Kingdoms XI in 2008.

Power up kit
Power up kit includes following features:

4 new scenarios.

References

External links
Japan Gamecity RTK5 for PSP page (in Japanese language)
Satakore.com page (SS version)

1996 video games
Grand strategy video games
PlayStation (console) games
PlayStation Portable games
Japan-exclusive video games
5
Turn-based strategy video games
DOS games
Sega Saturn games
Video games developed in Japan